Glean Alpine may mean:

 Glen Alpine, New South Wales, Australia
 Glen Alpine, North Carolina, United States
 Glen Alpine, Nova Scotia, Canada
 Glen Alpine, Toowoomba, a heritage-listed house in Queensland, Australia